Rudraprayag is a town and a municipality in Rudraprayag district in the Indian state of Uttarakhand. Rudraprayag is one of the Panch Prayag (five confluences) of Alaknanda River, the point of confluence of rivers Alaknanda and Mandakini. Kedarnath, a Hindu holy town is located 86 km from Rudraprayag. The man-eating Leopard of Rudraprayag hunted and written about by Jim Corbett dwelled here.

Geography
It has an average elevation of 895 metres (2,936 feet).

Many of the newer buildings and particularly the Sangam (confluence) area was severely damaged in the 2013 Uttarakhand floods.  A footbridge over the Mandakini river, and also a road bridge 6 km downstream at Raitoli was washed away.  The layout of the Sangam has altered significantly.  The road along the Mandakini valley, leading to Kedarnath, was damaged at many points.

Demographics
According to the 2011 census, the population of Rudraprayag is 9,313, of which 5,240 are males while 4,073 are females. Female Sex Ratio of Rudraprayag is 777 against a state average of 963. Moreover, the Child Sex Ratio in Rudraprayag is around 803 compared to the Uttarakhand state average of 890. The literacy rate of Rudraprayag city is 89.42% higher than the state average of 78.82%. In Rudraprayag, male literacy is around 93.43%, while the female literacy rate is 84.24%. 

Hinduism is practised by 95.16% of the total population and is the major religion of Rudraprayag. Islam is practiced by 4.37% of people and is the largest minority religion. Christianity is practised by 0.29%, Sikhism by 0.02%, and Buddhism by 0.01% of the people. Hindi and Sanskrit are the official languages of the state while Garhwali is the mother tongue of the majority.

How to reach

Air

Railway
The nearest railway station is at Rishikesh. However, Rishikesh is a small railway station not connected by fast trains. Dehradun and Haridwar railway stations, 44 km and 24 km respectively farther from Rishikesh, has train connections to most of the major cities in India and is, therefore, the railhead for Rudraprayag.

Road
Rudraprayag lies on national highway NH58 that connects Delhi with Badrinath and Mana Pass in Uttarakhand near the Indo-Tibet border. Therefore, all buses and vehicles that carry pilgrims from New Delhi to Badrinath, via Haridwar and Rishikesh, in the pilgrimage season of summer months, pass through Rudraprayag on the way to Joshimath, and further north. Rishikesh is a starting point for road journeys to Rudraprayag, and regular buses operate from Rishikesh bus station to Rudraprayag. The road distance from Rishikesh to Rudraprayag is  via Devprayag and Srinagar.

 Haridwar to Rishikesh 24 km
 Rishikesh to Devprayag 74 km
 Devprayag to Srinagar     34 km
 Srinagar to Rudraprayag 33 km

Places nearby
 Rudranath Temple
Rudraprayag is named after Lord Shiva, and the temple of lord Rudranath is situated at the confluence of the Alaknanda and Mandakini rivers. According to mythology Narada Muni worshiped god Shiva here to learn music from him. The god then taught him music in his form of Rudra (Lord of Music). There used to be a rock called Narad Shila, where Narada is said to have sat in meditation.

Dhari Devi Mandir is situated at Kalyasaur in between Srinagar and Rudraprayag. Distance between Srinagar-Dhari Devi and Dhari Devi-Rudraprayag is 16 km and 20 km, respectively. One can reach here with no trouble by taxi or bus  from Srinagar and Rudraprayag.

 Chamunda Devi Temple 
Chamunda Devi temple is also situated at the confluence of the holy rivers ( Alaknanda & Mandakini). Chamunda as the wife of Lord Rudra is worshiped here.

 Koteshwar 
Koti means crore (10 Million), and Ishwar means god, is again a temple of Lord Shiva made by natural caves.

 Shree Tungeshwar Mahadev Ji, Phalasi (फलासी) Near Chopta 
This temple has been here for centuries. Folklore has it that the Pandavas came here for penance. On the way from Chopta, there are many small temples up to the Tunganath Temple. On the temple walls, are terracotta style seals and Shiva-Parvati figurines.

 Kartik Swami 
The Kartik Swami temple is dedicated to Lord Kartikeya - son of Lord Shiva. It can be reached by a 3 km trek from Kanak Chauri village, which is located on the Rudraprayag-Pokhri route, 38 km from Rudraprayag. Visitors can see the snow-clad Himalayan range from the Kartik Swami temple.

 Basukedar 
Basukedar is where Shiva reputedly lived, before coming to Kedarnath. It's a Shiva temple constructed by Pandavas. The architecture and idols seem to be at least 1000 yrs old. It is a good place for meditation and dhyana yoga. It is around 35 km from Agustmuni. around 1.30 hr by drive. This is actually an old track to visit Kedarnath. It is said that Lord Shiva stayed a night in Basukedar while he was travelling to Kedarnath; this is the reason this place is called Basukedar

Kedarnath Temple

Kedarnath Dham, one of the twelve Jyotirlingas of Shiva, is situated in the Himalayan , it is believed that the Kedarnath temple was built by the Pandavas in ancient times. Later, King Bhoj of Malwa also did some work related to temple construction. Most people believe that the present form of the temple was built by Adi Shankaracharya in the 8th century. The temple doors are closed for 6 months during the winter period, during this time the unbroken holdings in the temple keep on burning for 6 months.

Photo gallery (Images before June, 2013)

See also 

 Leopard of Rudraprayag

References

External links

Rudraprayag city, Official website
Rudraprayag district website
Rudraprayag at wikimapia

 
Cities and towns in Rudraprayag district
Tourism in Uttarakhand